Air Marshal Sreedhara Panicker Radha Krishnan Nair (born 7 July 1958), PVSM, AVSM, VM, Mention in Dispatches is a retired officer of Indian Air Force who was Air Officer Commanding-in-Chief (AOC-in-C), Training Command of the Indian Air Force from 1 September 2015 to 31 July 2018. He succeeded Air Marshal Ramesh Rai.

Early life and education 
Nair was born on 7 July 1958 at Thiruvananthapuram, Kerala. He is an alumnus of Loyola School, Thiruvananthapuram and  National Defence Academy, Pune.

Career 
Nair was commissioned into the transport stream of the Indian Air Force in June 1980. He has clocked over 7200 hours of flying and has experience on many different types of aircraft's including Otter, Avro, An-32, Dornier and IL-76. He held several key operational and administrative appointments at various stages of his service including Chief Operations Officer of a Transport Base; Commanding Officer of a strategic Air lift Squadron; Director Operations (Transport) at Air Headquarters; Air Officer Commanding of AFS Chandigarh; Assistant Chief of the Air Staff (Personnel Airmen and Civilians); Assistant Chief of the Air Staff (Transport & Helicopter) and Senior Air Staff Officer of Training Command. He has also been extensively involved in many military operations including Operation Pawan, Operation Cactus, Operations Parakram and Operation Safed Sagar. As the Flight Commander, he was directly involved in initiating night operations to Leh and Thoise on the IL-76 aircraft. He has led multiple airborne exercises with foreign countries including Exercise Blue Crane in South Africa in 1999, Exercise Cooperative Cope Thunder in USA in 2003 and Russia in Exercise INDRA 2007. He captained a flight to the North Pole in an Indian Air Force (IAF) IL-76 aircraft on 20 Jun 2003, making it the first Indian aircraft to fly over  the true North pole. He played a pivotal role in operationalising Daulet Beg Oldi, the highest air strip in the world , for An-32 and C-130 aircraft. He was involved in numerous disaster relief operations during the 2001 Gujarat earthquake, Super cyclone in Orissa, 2004 Indian Ocean Tsunami, Mumbai Floods, Cyclone Katrina, China Earthquake and was the Air Force co-ordinator for Operation Rahat. He is a qualified Flying Instructor, has been an Air Force Examiner and is the Commodore Commandant of 44 Squadron (Mighty Jets).
He joined the Armed Forces Tribunal as the Technical Member at the Kochi Bench on 15 September 2020.

Awards and medals 
During 38 years of his career, Nair has been awarded several medals: AOC-in-C Commendation, Chief of the Air Staff Commendation, GOC-in-C Commendation, Mention-in-Despatch (1999),  the Vayu Sena Medal (2005), the Ati Vishisht Seva Medal (January 2010) and the Param Vishisht Seva Medal (January 2017).

Personal life 
He is married to Geethanjali Nair and their daughter Karthika Nair (Director & Head of Operations, Praesedia Biotherapeutics Pvt. Ltd.) is married to Manu Balachandran, Associate Editor, Forbes India.

References 

Living people
Indian Air Force air marshals
Recipients of the Param Vishisht Seva Medal
Recipients of the Ati Vishisht Seva Medal
1958 births
Recipients of the Vayu Sena Medal